The year 1875 in architecture involved some significant events.

Buildings and structures

Buildings

 January 5 – Palais Garnier, home of the Paris Opera in France, designed by Charles Garnier, opens.
 June 13 – Sage Chapel at Cornell University, designed by Charles Babcock, holds opening services.
 Sydney Town Hall in Sydney, Australia is completed.
 William Watts Sherman House, Newport, Rhode Island, designed by Henry Hobson Richardson, is built.
 The Hermannsdenkmal monument in Berlin, Germany, designed by sculptor Ernst von Bandel, is completed.
 Cize–Bolozon viaduct opens to rail traffic across the Ain in France.

Awards
 RIBA Royal Gold Medal – Edmund Sharpe.
 Grand Prix de Rome, architecture: Edmond Paulin.

Organisations
 German firm Wayss & Freitag formed, who pioneered reinforced concrete.

Births
 May 12 – Charles Holden, English architect noted for London Underground stations (died 1960)
 July – W. Curtis Green, English commercial architect (died 1960)
 August 11 – Percy Erskine Nobbs, Scottish-born Canadian Arts and Crafts architect (died 1964)

Deaths
 February 28 – Robert Willis, English mechanical engineer, phonetician and architectural historian (born 1800)
 June 5 – E. W. Pugin, English ecclesiastical architect (born 1834)
 June 24 – Henri Labrouste, French architect (born 1801)

References

Architecture
Years in architecture
19th-century architecture